The 2006 Texas gubernatorial election was held on November 7, 2006, to elect the governor of Texas. The election was a rare five-way race, with incumbent Republican Governor Rick Perry running for re-election against Democrat Chris Bell and Independents Carole Keeton Strayhorn and Kinky Friedman, as well as Libertarian nominee James Werner. 

Perry was re-elected to a second full term in office, winning 39% of the vote to Bell's 30%, Strayhorn's 18%, and Friedman's 12%. Perry carried 209 out of the state's 254 counties, while Bell carried 39 and Strayhorn carried 6. Exit polls revealed that Perry won the white vote with 46%, while Bell got 22%, Strayhorn got 16% and Friedman got 15%. Bell won 63% of African Americans, while Perry got 16%, Strayhorn got 15% and Friedman got 4%. Bell also won the Latino vote with 41%, while Perry got 31%, Strayhorn got 18% and Friedman got 4%.

Perry was inaugurated for a second full four-year term on January 16, 2007. The ceremony was held inside the House of Representatives chamber at the Texas Capitol after thunderstorms canceled the planned outdoor ceremony. This remains the last time Republicans won a statewide race in Texas with only a plurality.

Requirements

It is difficult for an independent gubernatorial candidate to gain ballot access in the state of Texas.  The election law, summarized briefly, requires the following:
The candidate must obtain signatures from registered voters, in an amount equalling at least one percent of the total votes cast in the prior gubernatorial election.  For the 2006 ballot, this required 45,540 signatures.  (This is also the number of signatures required for a third party to gain ballot access, which only the Libertarian Party did in 2006.)
The signatures must come from registered voters who did not vote in either the Democratic or Republican primaries or in any runoff elections for governor.
The signatures must come from registered voters who have not signed a petition for any other independent candidate.  In other words, a Strayhorn supporter cannot also sign Friedman's petition, nor vice versa.  If a supporter signed more than one petition, only the first signature counts.
The signatures must be obtained within 60 days following the primary election; the window is shortened to 30 days if a runoff election for either party's gubernatorial candidate is required.  In 2006, neither party had a runoff election for governor; therefore, the candidates had the full 60 days – until May 11, 2006.

In the event a candidate does not qualify for independent status, they may still run as a write-in candidate.  The candidate must pay a $3,750 filing fee and submit 5,000 qualified signatures.  However, the filing cannot take place any earlier than July 30, nor later than 5:00 PM on August 29.

Primaries

Republican

|}

Democratic

|}

Other candidates

Independent
Kinky Friedman – country singer, and mystery author.
Carole Keeton Strayhorn – Comptroller, former Railroad Commissioner, former City of Austin Mayor, and former Austin Independent School District Board of Trustees President, who spent June through December 2005 seeking the Republican nomination.

Libertarian
James Werner – Sales Consultant.

Campaign

Perry
Incumbent Rick Perry became governor in late 2000 when then-Governor George W. Bush resigned following his election as President of the United States. He had been elected lieutenant governor in 1998. Perry was subsequently elected governor in his own right in 2002 and successfully ran for a second full term in 2006.

Perry's overall poll ratings had plummeted since the 2002 election, plagued by budget woes, battles over school financing reform, and a contentious and controversial redistricting battle. His approval rating dropped to 38% during the latter part of the 2005 legislative session. Perry then improved from this position, more recently holding a 44% approval rating, with 51% disapproving, as of a September 2006 poll. Texas election laws do not require a run-off in the event that a majority is not achieved, and so Governor Perry joined only two other Texas governors to achieve the office by a plurality of less than 40%. The Texas Governor Elections of 1853 and 1861 both won with less than 40% of the vote.

Despite weak polling numbers, Perry had the support of the Texas GOP. According to Perry's campaign website, he gained 142 separate endorsements. Perry had endorsements from virtually the entire Texas GOP Congressional delegation (all but two members), every other Republican statewide officeholder (except Strayhorn and judicial officeholders; the latter by law cannot endorse political candidates), 51 of the 62 members of the Texas Republican Party executive committee, and nearly every major Texas pro-business, fiscal conservative, and social conservative organization and PAC. Perry even managed to gain the endorsement of the Teamsters Union, notwithstanding Texas's strong right to work laws.

Friedman

Kinky Friedman, an independent candidate, gained a good amount of popular support among Texas voters. He claimed that country-music lovers, college students, animal lovers, ranchers, and anyone who didn't vote in the last election were among his supporters.

Friedman briefly enjoyed a high standing in the polls, and surpassed Democrat Chris Bell by Independence Day. As Election Day drew near, his campaign fizzled out as much of his wide support was among young voters. He finished fourth in the election with under 13% of the vote.  His website claimed that "he doesn't put much stock in unscientific political polls among "likely" voters, saying, "It's Kinky Friedman versus apathy". Friedman stated during the campaign that he was going after the 71% who didn't make it to the polls in 2002.

Bell
Chris Bell, a former Congressman from Houston, filed an ethics complaint against former House Majority Leader Tom DeLay as a lame duck who had been defeated in his party's primary after the controversial mid-decade redistricting in the state. Bell announced his run in July 2005.

Bell's official strategy was to get Democrats to unite behind and vote for a Democrat, predicting (and betting on) a splintering of the Republican vote among Perry, Strayhorn, and Friedman, giving the Democrats the needed plurality to win the election. Running on a platform of ethics reform and education issues, he stayed with the pack of three candidates with better name recognition.  After a good debate performance, his poll numbers improved significantly to where he had taken second place in nearly every poll afterward.

Strayhorn

Carole Keeton Strayhorn, the Comptroller of Public Accounts, was initially pegged as running in a potentially contentious three-way Republican primary battle with bitter rival Governor Perry and U.S. Senator Kay Bailey Hutchison. Hutchison declined to run for governor in late 2005, instead opting to run for re-election to the Senate. This left Strayhorn and Perry vying for the GOP nomination. Believing her chances to be better running as an independent and appealing directly to voters, rather than those of the Republican Party first, she announced her intent to challenge him in the general election instead. Had she run in the primary, the December 2005 Scripps Howard Texas Poll of match ups had Perry in the lead against Strayhorn by a 55%-24% margin.

Strayhorn was seen as a moderate alternative to Perry, and found support among moderate Republicans and independent voters. Although a few polls had her tied for second going into Election day, she finished with 18.13% of the vote, 12% behind Bell and 21% behind Perry.

Werner

James Werner was the Libertarian Party candidate. According to Werner's campaign website, he has a master's degree in Spanish and Latin American literature from the University of California, a bachelor's degree from Vanderbilt University and is currently working for an Austin-based educational software company.

Werner previously ran for Congress in 2004 as the Libertarian nominee. Contending for the 25th District, he garnered 26,748 votes or 0.61%.

Dillon
James "Patriot" Dillon was the only announced write-in candidate, according to information from the Texas Secretary of State's office.

Debates

Predictions

Polling
Graphical summary

* denotes polling result winner is within the margin of error

** denotes data was not reported by the pollster

Results
Percent change available only for parties that participated in the 2002 Texas gubernatorial election.

See also
 2006 United States gubernatorial elections

External links
Interview with Richard "Kinky" Friedman, January 14, 2011. University of Texas at San Antonio: Institute of Texan Cultures: Oral History Collection, UA 15.01, University of Texas at San Antonio Libraries Special Collections. 
The Texas Constitution
Texas Secretary of State Elections info
Governor Rick Perry campaign
James Werner campaign
Chris Bell campaign
Texas Green 2006 candidates
Libertarian Party of Texas

References

Gubernatorial
2006
Texas
Rick Perry